Celebrity Big Brother 2015 may refer to:

Celebrity Big Brother 15
Celebrity Big Brother 16